Mochlus mafianus, also known as the Mafia writhing skink, is a species of skink. It is found on Mafia and Kisuju Islands, off the coast of Tanzania. It inhabits coastal woodland and savanna.

References

Mochlus
Skinks of Africa
Reptiles of Tanzania
Endemic fauna of Tanzania
Reptiles described in 1994
Taxa named by Donald George Broadley